Fop is a pejorative term for a foolish man.

FOP or fop may also refer to:

Science and technology
 Feature-oriented positioning, in scanning microscopy
 Feature-oriented programming, in computer science, software product lines
 Fibrodysplasia ossificans progressiva, a connective tissue disease which can result in muscles fusing into bone
 Formatting Objects Processor, a Java application
 fop herbicides, the aryloxyphenoxypropionate subtype of ACCase inhibitors

Other uses
 The Fairly OddParents, an American television series
 Fellowship of Presbyterians, now The Fellowship Community, a Christian movement in the United States
 Festival of Praise, a music festival in Singapore
 Flowery orange pekoe, a grade of tea leaf
 Fop Smit (1777–1866), Dutch naval architect and shipbuilder
 Fraternal Order of Police, an American police organization
 Fred. Olsen Production, a Norwegian gas and oil company
 Freedom of panorama, a concept in copyright law
 Morris Army Airfield, in Georgia, United States
 FOP grade tea
 Federation of Planets, from Star Trek